Olavi Lahtinen (5 January 1929 – 12 May 1965) was a Finnish footballer. He played in 27 matches for the Finland national football team from 1953 to 1958. He was also named in Finland's squad for the Group 2 qualification tournament for the 1954 FIFA World Cup. In Mestaruussarja he played 185 games and scored 55 goals. He also scored 44 goals in second level Suomensarja for Helsingin Jalkapalloklubi.

References

External links
 

1929 births
1965 deaths
Finnish footballers
Finland international footballers
Place of birth missing
Association football forwards
Helsingin Jalkapalloklubi players